Bangad Kupinde is an urban municipality located in Salyan district of Karnali Province of Nepal.

The municipality is divided into total 12 wards. The headquarters of municipality is located in ward no. 1 which is called Devisthal.

On 10 March 2017 Government of Nepal announced 744 local level units as per the new constitution of Nepal 2015. Thus, Bangad Kupinde municipality came into existence on 10 March 2017 merging the former following Villages: Devisthal, Bame Banghad, Mulkhola, Dhagari Pipal, Kubhinde, Majh Khanda and Nigalchula.

Demographics
At the time of the 2011 Nepal census, Bangad Kupinde Municipality had a population of 36,135. Of these, 99.8% spoke Nepali, 0.1% Hindi and 0.1% Urdu as their first language.

In terms of ethnicity/caste, 46.5% were Chhetri, 23.5% Magar, 14.6% Kami, 5.2% Damai/Dholi, 4.6% Sanyasi/Dasnami, 1.7% Hill Brahmin, 1.6% Thakuri, 1.1% Sarki, 0.3% Badi and 0.9% others.

In terms of religion, 97.4% were Hindu, 2.4% Christian, 0.1% Muslim and 0.1% others.

References

External links
www.bangadkupindemun.gov.np

Populated places in Salyan District, Nepal
Municipalities in Karnali Province
Nepal municipalities established in 2017